Lyford Consolidated Independent School District (LCISD) is a school district headquartered in Lyford, Texas, United States.

LCISD serves the city of Lyford and unincorporated areas in Willacy County, Cameron County, and Hidalgo County. Unincorporated areas in Willacy County served by LCISD include Lyford South, Santa Monica, Sebastian, Willamar, and Zapata Ranch. Unincorporated areas in Cameron County served by LCISD include Yznaga.

In the fall of 1999, LCISD opened a new  middle school, replacing a  middle school.

In 2009, the school district was rated "academically acceptable" by the Texas Education Agency.

Mascot
Bulldogs

UIL Classification
3A

Schools
 Lyford High School
 Lyford Middle School
 Lyford Elementary School

References

External links
 
 Texas State School Performance Review of Lyford CISD

School districts in Cameron County, Texas
School districts in Hidalgo County, Texas
School districts in Willacy County, Texas